Zlatica Mijatović Waldman (1 March 1922 – 15 February 2019) was a Serbian gymnast. She competed in the women's artistic team all-around at the 1948 Summer Olympics.

References

1922 births
2019 deaths
Serbian female artistic gymnasts
Olympic gymnasts of Yugoslavia
Gymnasts at the 1948 Summer Olympics
Sportspeople from Sombor